Ericameria parishii, or Parish's rabbitbrush, is a western North American species of flowering plants in the family Asteraceae.

Distribution
The plant is native to southern Southern California in the United States and to the State of Baja California in Mexico. It is found in the San Gabriel Mountains, Verdugo Mountains, eastern Santa Monica Mountains, and San Bernardino Mountains of the Transverse Ranges; and in the Peninsular Ranges.

Description
It has lance-shaped leaves up to 2 inches (5 cm) long.

One plant can produce many small flower heads, each with up to 12 golden yellow disc florets but no ray florets.

Varieties
Varieties include:
Ericameria parishii var. parishii - northern Baja California; California in the mountains from San Diego County north to eastern Ventura County and southwestern San Bernardino County
Ericameria parishii var. peninsularis (Moran) G.L.Nesom — Peninsular Ranges of northern Baja California state.

References

External links
Calflora Database: Ericameria parishii (Parish's rabbitbrush)
Jepson eFlora treatment of Ericameria parishii var. parishii
Photo of herbarium specimen at Missouri Botanical Garden, collected in California in 1881, isotype of Bigelovia parishii/Ericameria parishii
UC Photos gallery: Ericameria parishii
UC Photos gallery: Ericameria parishii var. parishii

parishii
Flora of Baja California
Flora of California
Natural history of the California chaparral and woodlands
Natural history of the Peninsular Ranges
Natural history of the Transverse Ranges
Plants described in 1882
Taxa named by Asa Gray
Flora without expected TNC conservation status